The 1985 NHL Entry Draft was the 23rd NHL Entry Draft. It was the first draft outside Montreal. The event was held at the Metro Toronto Convention Centre in Toronto, Ontario, and attended by 7,000 fans. The National Hockey League (NHL) teams selected 252 players eligible for entry into professional ranks, in the reverse order of the 1984–85 NHL season and playoff standings. This is the list of those players selected.

Toronto hosted and made the first overall pick; this coincidence would not occur again until Montreal hosted and drafted first at the 2022 Draft. 

The last active players in the NHL from this draft class were Joe Nieuwendyk and Sean Burke, who both played their last NHL games in the 2006–07 season.

Selections by round
Below are listed the selections in the 1985 NHL Entry Draft.

Club teams are located in North America unless otherwise noted.

Round one

 The Minnesota North Stars' first-round pick went to the New York Islanders as the result of a trade on November 19, 1984 that sent Roland Melanson to Minnesota in exchange for an optional 1st-rd pick in 1985 NHL Entry Draft (this pick) or 1986 NHL Entry Draft.
 The Boston Bruins' first-round pick went to the Los Angeles Kings as the result of a trade on October 24, 1984 that sent Charlie Simmer to Boston in exchange for this pick.
 The St. Louis Blues' first-round pick went to the Montreal Canadiens as the result of a trade on June 15, 1985 that sent Mike Dark,  Mark Hunter, Montreal's second-round, third-round, fifth-round and sixth-round picks in 1985 NHL Entry Draft to St. Louis in exchange for St. Louis' second-round, fourth-round, fifth-round and sixth-round picks in 1985 NHL Entry Draft and this pick.

Round two

 The Minnesota North Stars' second-round pick went to the Calgary Flames as the result of a trade on June 15, 1985 that sent Kent Nilsson and an optional third-round picks in 1986 NHL Entry Draft or 1987 NHL Entry Draft to Calgary in exchange for Minnesota' second-round pick in 1987 NHL Entry Draft and this pick.
 The Chicago Black Hawks' second-round pick went to the New Jersey Devils as the result of a trade on June 19, 1984 that sent Bob MacMillan and New Jersey's fifth-round picks in 1985 NHL Entry Draft to Chicago in exchange for Don Dietrich, Rich Preston and this pick.
 The St. Louis Blues' second-round pick went to the Montreal Canadiens as the result of a trade on June 15, 1985 that sent Mike Dark,  Mark Hunter, Montreal's second-round, third-round, fifth-round and sixth-round picks in 1985 NHL Entry Draft to St. Louis in exchange for St. Louis' first-round, fourth-round, fifth-round and sixth-round picks in 1985 NHL Entry Draft and this pick.
 The Montreal Canadiens' second-round pick went to the St. Louis Blues as the result of a trade on June 15, 1985 that sent St. Louis' first-round, second-round, fourth-round, fifth-round and sixth-round picks in 1985 NHL Entry Draft to Montreal in exchange for Mike Dark,  Mark Hunter, Montreal's third-round, fifth-round, sixth-round picks in 1985 NHL Entry Draft and this pick.

Round three

 The Montreal Canadiens' third-round pick went to the St. Louis Blues as the result of a trade on June 15, 1985 that sent St. Louis' first-round, second-round, fourth-round, fifth-round and sixth-round picks in 1985 NHL Entry Draft to Montreal in exchange for Mike Dark,  Mark Hunter, Montreal's second-round, fifth-round, sixth-round picks in 1985 NHL Entry Draft and this pick.
 Montreal previously acquired this pick as the result of a trade on September 15, 1982 that sent that sent Denis Herron to Pittsburgh in exchange for this pick.
 The Hartford Whalers' third-round pick went to the Montreal Canadiens as the result of a trade on December 21, 1981 that sent Pierre Larouche, Montreal's first-round pick in 1984 NHL Entry Draft and third-round pick in 1985 NHL Entry Draft to Hartford in exchange for Hartford's first=round and second-round pick in 1984 NHL Entry Draft along with this pick.
 The Minnesota North Stars' third-round pick went to the Philadelphia Flyers as the result of a trade on February 23, 1984 that sent Paul Holmgren to Minnesota in exchange for the rights to Paul Guay and this pick.
 The Los Angeles Kings' third-round pick went to the Minnesota North Stars as the result of a trade on February 1, 1983 that sent Markus Mattsson to Los Angeles in exchange for this pick.
 The Hartford Whalers' third-round pick went to the Pittsburgh Penguins as the result of a trade on September 30, 1983 that sent  Greg Malone to Hartford in exchange for this pick.
 Hartford previously acquired this pick as the result of a trade on December 21, 1981 that sent that sent Hartford's first-round and second-round picks in 1984 NHL Entry Draft with a third-round pick in 1985 NHL Entry Draft to Montreal in exchange for Pierre Larouche, Montreal's first-round pick in 1984 NHL Entry Draft and this pick.

Round four

 The Boston Bruins' fourth-round pick went to the Quebec Nordiques as the result of a trade on October 25, 1984 that sent Louis Sleigher to Boston in exchange for Luc Dufour and this pick.
 Boston previously acquired this pick as the result of a trade on October 15, 1984 that sent that sent  Randy Hillier to Pittsburgh in exchange for this pick.
 The St. Louis Blues' fourth-round pick went to the Montreal Canadiens as the result of a trade on June 15, 1985 that sent Mike Dark,  Mark Hunter, Montreal's second-round, third-round, fifth-round and sixth-round picks in 1985 NHL Entry Draft to St. Louis in exchange for St. Louis' first-round, second-round, fifth-round and sixth-round picks in 1985 NHL Entry Draft and this pick.
 The Edmonton Oilers' fourth-round pick went to the Washington Capitals as the result of a trade on March 6, 1984 that sent the rights to Risto Jalo to Edmonton in exchange for this pick.

Round five

 The New Jersey Devils' fifth-round pick went to the Chicago Black Hawks as the result of a trade on June 19, 1984 that sent Don Dietrich, Rich Preston and Chicago's second-round picks in 1985 NHL Entry Draft to New Jersey in exchange for Bob MacMillan and this pick.
 The Hartford Whalers' fifth-round pick went to the New York Islanders as the result of a trade on August 19, 1983 that sent Steve Stoyanovich to Hartford in exchange for this pick.
 The St. Louis Blues'fifth-round pick went to the Montreal Canadiens as the result of a trade on June 15, 1985 that sent Mike Dark,  Mark Hunter, Montreal's second-round, third-round, fifth-round and sixth-round picks in 1985 NHL Entry Draft to St. Louis in exchange for St. Louis' first-round, second-round, fourth-round and sixth-round picks in 1985 NHL Entry Draft and this pick.
 The Montreal Canadiens' fifth-round pick went to the St. Louis Blues as the result of a trade on June 15, 1985 that sent St. Louis' first-round, second-round, fourth-round, fifth-round and sixth-round picks in 1985 NHL Entry Draft to Montreal in exchange for Mike Dark,  Mark Hunter, Montreal's second-round, third-round, sixth-round picks in 1985 NHL Entry Draft and this pick.

Round six

 The Los Angeles Kings' sixth-round pick went to the Pittsburgh Penguins as the result of a trade on October 15, 1983 that sent Marc Chorney to Los Angeles in exchange for this pick.
 The St. Louis Blues'sixth-round pick went to the Montreal Canadiens as the result of a trade on June 15, 1985 that sent Mike Dark,  Mark Hunter, Montreal's second-round, third-round, fifth-round and sixth-round picks in 1985 NHL Entry Draft to St. Louis in exchange for St. Louis' first-round, second-round, fourth-round and fifth-round picks in 1985 NHL Entry Draft and this pick.
 The Montreal Canadiens' sixth-round pick went to the St. Louis Blues as the result of a trade on June 15, 1985 that sent St. Louis' first-round, second-round, fourth-round, fifth-round and sixth-round picks in 1985 NHL Entry Draft to Montreal in exchange for Mike Dark,  Mark Hunter, Montreal's second-round, third-round, fifth-round picks in 1985 NHL Entry Draft and this pick.

Round seven

Round eight

Round nine

Round ten

 The Los Angeles Kings' tenth-round pick went to the Montreal Canadiens as the result of a trade on November 18, 1984 that sent Steve Shutt to Los Angeles in exchange for this pick.
 The Philadelphia Flyers' tenth-round pick went to the Boston Bruins as the result of a trade on May 24, 1984 that sent Ian Armstrong to Philadelphia in exchange for this pick.

Round eleven

Round twelve

Draftees based on nationality

See also
 1985–86 NHL season
 List of NHL players

References

External links
 1985 NHL Entry Draft player stats at The Internet Hockey Database

Draft
National Hockey League Entry Draft
NHL Entry Draft
June 1985 sports events in Canada